Leonard Leabeater (10 July 1906 – 1 June 1996) was an Australian cricketer. He played four first-class matches for New South Wales between 1929/30 and 1931/32.

See also
 List of New South Wales representative cricketers

References

External links
 

1906 births
1996 deaths
Australian cricketers
New South Wales cricketers
Cricketers from Sydney